This is a list of election results for the electoral district of Murray in South Australian elections.

Members for Murray

Election results

Elections in the 1980s

Elections in the 1970s

Elections in the 1960s

Elections in the 1950s

 Two party preferred vote was estimated.

Elections in the 1940s

 Preferences were not distributed.

Elections in the 1930s

References

South Australian state electoral results by district